The following is a timeline of the history of the municipality of Antwerp, Belgium.

Prior to 13th century
 from abt. 150 – abt. 250-270: Gallo-Roman settlement in the centre of Antwerp (at "Willem Ogierplaats").
 abt 700: Oldest mention of the name Andoverpis in a written source : the Vita Eligii dated early 8th century (abt. 700).
 739: death of Saint Willibrord, bishop.
 978: Treaty of Margut-sur-Chiers, between France and German empire, the river Scheldt is recognised as the border between Neustria and Lotharingia
 980 -  the German Emperor Otto II awarded Antwerp a margraviate, and build a fortification on the wharf (de burg) with a ditch the "burchtgracht"
 1100 The Roya is a small natural river that runs outside the "Burchtgracht"
 1104 The fortification of the "Burcht" is reinforced by Emperor Hendrik IV.
 1109: Antwerp starts making city canals the "ruienstelsel" From the Koolvliet in the north via, Holenrui, Minderbroedersrui to Suikerrui and Botervliet in the south

13th–15th century 
 1250 - Construction of the second Vleeshuis, city butchery and Guildhouse of the butchers
 1406 - City becomes part of the Duchy of Brabant.
 1442 - Guild of Saint Luke granted privileges.
 1477 - Quaeye Werelt revolt 
1478
Joyous Entry of Maximilian I, Holy Roman Emperor into the city.
Violieren chamber of rhetoric founded.
 1481 - Matt. Van der Goes sets up printing press.
 1491 - One of the world's "first" illustrated advertisements printed in Antwerp.

16th century

 1503 - Construction of the third Vleeshuis, current building, city butchery and guildhouse of the butchers .
 1513 - Guild Hall of the Archers built.
 1515 - Joyous Entry of Charles V, Holy Roman Emperor into the city.
 1518 - Notre Dame Cathedral built.
 1520 - Het Steen fortress rebuilt.
 1523 - Church of St. Andrew built.
 1528 - Merten de Keyser (printer) in business (approximate date).
 1531 - Opening of the Bourse of Antwerp, the first purpose-built exchange.
 1533 - Lancelot II of Ursel saves the Cathedral from total ruin.
 1543 - Music publisher Susato in business.
 1549 - Philip II of Spain visits city.
 1552 - Girls' orphanage built.
 1555 - Christophe Plantin (printer) in business.
 1560s - Antwerp Citadel built.
 1565 - City Hall built.
 1566 - August: Protestant Reformation riots.
 1567 - 13 March: Battle of Oosterweel occurs near city.
 1568
 Anthony van Stralen, Lord of Merksem, former mayor is executed..
 Maison Hanseatique built.
 Population: 125,000.
 1570 - Theatrum Orbis Terrarum atlas published.
 1571 - Church of St. Paul built.
 1572 - Antwerp Citadel completed.
 1576 - 4 November: during the Sack of Antwerp, John III van de Werve, Lord of Hovorst gets killed by the Spanish forces,.
 1577 - Antwerp Citadel partially dismantled.
 1579
 City joins Union of Utrecht.
 Hall of the Coopers built.
 1583 - 17 January: François, Duke of Anjou tries to take city.
 1584 - July: Siege of Antwerp begins.
 1585
 August: Siege of Antwerp ends; Alexander Farnese, Duke of Parma in power.
 Population: 85,000.
 1589
 Church of the Capuchins built.
 Population: 55,000.
 1593 - Hieronymus Verdussen (printer) in business (approximate date).
 1594 - Joyous Entry of Archduke Ernest of Austria into the city.
 1599 - Isabella and Albert (Habsburg Netherlands sovereigns) make their Joyous Entry into the city.

17th–18th centuries

 1603 - Nicolaas II Rockox builds the Rockox House.
 1609 - Twelve Years' Truce signed.
 1615 - Church of Augustinians built.
 1621 - Carolus Borromeuskerk built.
 1635 - Joyous Entry of Cardinal-Infante Ferdinand into the city.
 1638 - 20 June: Battle of Kallo.
 1644 - House of the Tailors rebuilt.
 1646 - Hall of the Carpenters rebuilt.
 1646 - Siege of Antwerp by Frederick Henry failed.
 1648
 River Scheldt closed to navigation per Treaty of Münster.
 Joyous Entry of Archduke Leopold Wilhelm of Austria into the city.
 1656 - St. James' Church built.
 1663 - Royal Academy of Fine Arts founded.
 1745 - Royal Residence built on the Meir.
 1746 - Osterrieth House built on the Meir.
 1750 - Royal Horticultural and Agricultural Society exhibitions begin (approximate date).
 1755 - Royal Palace built.
 1790 - Population: 40,000.
 1795 - City becomes capital of French département Deux-Nèthes.

19th century

 1802 - Quays built on Schelde River.
 1805 - City Library opens in City Hall.
 1810 - Royal Museum of Fine Arts founded.
 1811 - Bonaparte Dock built.
 1813 - Willem Dock built.
 1815 - City becomes part of the Kingdom of the Netherlands.
 1816 - Jewish Community established.
 1818 - Fortresses built.
 1826 - Orangery built in the Botanical Garden.
 1830
 Conflict between Belgian insurgents and Dutch forces.
 Population: 73,506.
 1832 - November–December: City besieged by French forces.
 1834
 Medical Society founded.
 Theatre Royal built.
 1843 - Zoological Garden founded.
 1846 - Population: 88,487.
 1848 - Jan Frans Loos becomes mayor.
 1852 - Wuyts art gallery opens (approximate date).
 1853
  inaugurated.
 Church of St. George consecrated.
 1859
 Berchem and Borgerhout become part of city (approximate date).
 Old city walls dismantled.
 Fortress construction begins.
 1860 -  Kattendijk built.
 1864 - Museum of Antiquities opens.
 1866 - Cholera epidemic.
 1867 - School of Music founded.
 1870 - Fort Merxem constructed.
 1871 - International Geographical Congress held.
 1872 - Exchange building and Flemish Theatre built.
 1873 - Horsecar trams begin operating.
 1874 - Demolition of Antwerp Citadel begins.
 1876 -  founded.
 1877 - Plantin-Moretus Museum opens.
 1879 - Population: 173,600.
 1880 - Royal Antwerp Football Club formed.
 1881 - Antwerp Water Works constructed.
 1883 - Library building opens.
 1884 - Royal Atheneum (school) built.
 1885
 Exposition Universelle d'Anvers (world's fair) held.
 Temperance conference held.
 1891 - Gazet van Antwerpen newspaper begins publication.
 1892 - Société Anversoise du Commerce au Congo in business.
 1893
  (Flemish Opera) founded.
 Hollandse Synagoge built.
 1894 - Exposition Internationale d'Anvers (world's fair) and Universal Peace Congress held.
 1895 - Compagnie Belge Maritime du Congo in business.
 1896 - National Archives' Antwerp branch founded.
 1897 -  newspaper begins publication.
 1898 - Royal Conservatory established.

20th century

 1902 - Electric trams begin operating.
 1903 - World Gymnastics Championships held.
 1904 - Museum Mayer van den Bergh built.
 1905 - Antwerpen-Centraal railway station and "America dock" open.
 1906 - Fort Breendonk built.
 1907 - Eisenmann Synagogue built.
 1910
 Population: 361,723.
 St. Boniface Church consecrated.
 1914 - September–October: Siege of Antwerp; German occupation begins.
 1920
 1920 Summer Olympics held.
 Compagnie Financière Belge des Pétroles headquartered in city.
  and Société Belge des Bétons founded
 1921 - Schoonselhof cemetery established.
 1923 - Airport opens.
 1928 - Antwerpsche Diamantkring established.
 1930 - Eeuwfeestkliniek (hospital) built.
 1931 - Antwerp Book Fair begins.
 1932 - Boerentoren built.
 1933 - Museum of Flemish Literature founded.
 1940 - May: German occupation begins.
 1944
 4 September: Liberation by the British 11th Armoured Division.
 October–November: Battle of the Scheldt.
 1946 - Rubens House museum opens.
 1966
 Sporthal Arena built.
 Wide White Space Gallery opens.
 1967 - Antwerp International School established.
 1968 - De Tijd newspaper begins publication.
 1969
 Jazz Middelheim festival begins.
 Kennedytunnel opens.
 Royal Ballet of Flanders established.
 1970 - Chicagoblok built.
 1975
 Antwerp Pre-metro begins operating.
 International Gemological Institute headquartered in city.
 1977 - 't Fornuis restaurant in business.
 1981 - Zeno X gallery opens.
 1983 - Berchem, Borgerhout, Deurne, Ekeren, Hoboken, Merksem, and Wilrijk become part of the city of Antwerp.
 1985 - Museum of Modern Art founded.
 1989 - Berendrecht Lock constructed.
 1994
 Laus Polyphoniae festival begins.
 Switel Hotel fire
 1995 - City website launched (Digitale Metropool Antwerpen).

21st century

 2003
 Patrick Janssens becomes mayor.
 University of Antwerp established.
 2004
 Fotomuseum Antwerp opens.
 City designated a UNESCO World Book Capital.
 2006
 0110 concert held.
 FelixArchief (city archives) and Law Courts building open.
 2007
 Antwerp World Diamond Centre established.
  shopping center opens.
 2011
 Museum aan de Stroom opens.
 Population: 507,007.
 2013 - Bart De Wever becomes mayor.

See also
 
 List of mayors of Antwerp
 List of schools in Antwerp
 List of parks in Antwerp
 
 Timelines of other municipalities in Belgium: Bruges, Brussels, Ghent, Leuven, Liège
 History of urban centers in the Low Countries

References

This article incorporates information from the Dutch Wikipedia and the French Wikipedia.

Bibliography

Published in the 18th-19th century
 
 
 
 
 
 
 
 
 
 
 
 
 

Published in the 20th century

External links

 Europeana. Items related to Antwerp, various dates.

 
Antwerp
Antwerp
antwerp
Years in Belgium